Sleaford Castle is a medieval castle in Sleaford, Lincolnshire, England. Built by the Bishop of Lincoln in the early 1120s, it was habitable as late as 1555 but fell into disrepair during the latter half of the 16th century. Two English monarchs are known to have stayed at the castle, King John and Henry VIII.

Medieval era
The castle was built between 1123 and 1139 by Alexander de Blois, Bishop of Lincoln from 1123 to 1147. Alexander built a quadrilateral castle, akin to his construction at Newark Castle, with square towers and massive keep. He sited it on flat fen rather than on high ground, perhaps even replacing an earlier moated manor house on the site. This shows he intended it for a manor house (for storing the produce from episcopal land, administering episcopal estates and providing accommodation for the bishop and his entourage when he visited the area) rather than for defence, though the flatness of the fen site would make it very hard for an enemy to approach unseen.

The building fulfilled its manor house function for most of its life, never withstanding an armed attack or siege but becoming one of the chief episcopal strongholds and an agricultural focus for the Bishop’s estates in Sleaford and elsewhere. An outline of a 40 by 15 metre tithe barn (said to be the largest in Lincolnshire, and with a cattle shed and hay loft attached) can still be seen in the southern half of the castle - local inhabitants would pay their tithe (or rent for farming the land) to the bishop, either by time working for the bishop (either on his land or serving in his army or castle  garrison), a share of their crop, or a cash sum.

A dam was placed across the river Slea at the end of Westgate, with a two-wheeled watermill behind it, producing a large pond to provide fresh fish for episcopal celebrations (an orchard just outside the castle provided fruit, and a dovecote to the east of the barn meat) along with rushes and thatch for roofing.

The nearest the castle came to a siege were on two occasions when the bishop was forced to hand over his keys to King Stephen during the Anarchy (by Alexander himself, to buy his release after Stephen's successful siege of Newark Castle) and to Edward II in the 1320s when his loyalties were doubted.

King John spent a night in the castle in October 1216 just after his disastrous crossing of the Wash and just before his death, and in 1430 Bishop Richard Fleming died in the castle.

Early modern period
Henry VIII stayed at Sleaford twice (once in 1541 with his queen Catherine Howard) and held a State Council at the Castle.  The castle passed into the hands of the Duke of Somerset in 1544, from whom it was confiscated by the crown in 1546.  On both occasions, and in 1555, it was still said to be defensible and habitable.  John Leland described it at this time as well maintained with a gatehouse, which housed two portcullises, and a high central tower, 'but not sette upon a hille of raised yerth'.

The castle began to fall into disrepair during the second half of the 16th century with the timber and lead roof being removed to be reused in buildings in the town, some of which survives to the present day.  The process of decline continued under the ownership of the Carre family. In 1604 it was described as ‘the late fair castle’, suggesting it had been largely or even fully dismantled before 1600. An early 18th-century engraving of the castle shows a ruin with a considerable amount of stonework still visible.

Present
The visible remains are now only a moat, a scrap of masonry (one small, toppled portion of a wall in the north-east corner of the inner bailey) and associated earthworks.  It is now a scheduled monument and a Grade II listed building protected by law.  It is also cultivated for wildlife.

See also
Castles in Great Britain and Ireland
List of castles in England

Sources

Websites
Local government pdf

Books
Salter, Mike, 2002, The Castles of the East Midlands (Malvern) p59
Thompson, M.W., 1998, Medieval bishops' houses in England and Wales (Aldershot: Ashgate Publishing) p179
Pettifer, A., 1995, English Castles, A guide by counties (Woodbridge) p148 [slight]
Roffe, David, 1993, 'Castles' in Bennett, S. and Bennett, N. (eds), An Historical Atlas of Lincolnshire (University of Hull Press) p40-1
King, D.J.C., 1983, Castellarium Anglicanum (London: Kraus) Vol1 p262
Fry, P.S., 1980, Castles of the British Isles (David and Charles) p298
Roffe, D.R.,1979, 'Origins', in Mahany, C.M., Roffe D.R. (eds) Sleaford (Stamford) p11-16
Renn, D.F., 1973 (2edn), Norman Castles of Britain (John Baker)
Beresford, M., 1967, New Towns of the Middle Ages (London) p466
Harvey, Alfred, 1911, Castles and Walled Towns of England (Methuen and Co)
Mackenzie, J.D., 1897, Castles of England (Heinemann) Vol1 p439-40
Arnold, T. (ed), 1879, Henrici Archidiaconi Huntendunensis Historia Anglorum (London) p266
Trollope, E., 1872, Sleaford and Wapentakes of Flaxwell and Aswardhurn in the County of Lincoln (London) p107-21

Journal articles
Brown, R, Allen, 1959, 'A List of Castles, 1154–1216' English Historical Review Vol74 [Reprinted in Brown, R. Allen, 1989, Castles, conquest and charters: collected papers (Woodbridge: Boydell Press) p249-280]

Antiquarian
William Camden, 1607, Britannia 
Toulmin Smith, Lucy (ed), 1910, The itinerary of John Leland in or about the years 1535–43 (Bell and Sons; London) Vol1 p26-7 and Vol5 p32

Buildings and structures completed in 1139
Castles in Lincolnshire
Grade II listed buildings in Lincolnshire
Scheduled monuments in Lincolnshire
Sleaford